Lecia Dole-Recio  (born 1971, San Francisco, CA) is an American artist based in Los Angeles, California. Dole-Recio received a Bachelor of Fine Arts at Rhode Island School of Design in 1994 and a Master of Fine Arts at the Art Center College of Design, Pasadena in 2011.  Dole-Recio's work incorporates abstract painting into layered collage pieces, utilizing paper and cardboard cut-outs. She is currently an art program faculty member at CalArts.

Her mother was a designer and her father a painter.

References

1971 births
Living people
American women artists
Art Center College of Design alumni
Artists from San Francisco
Rhode Island School of Design alumni
21st-century American women